Clova station is an unmanned Via Rail station located at 5 rue Latagne in Clova, Quebec, Canada. It was designated a Heritage Railway Station in 1995.

External links

Via Rail stations in Quebec
Railway stations in Mauricie
La Tuque, Quebec
Heritage sites in Mauricie